Avar Jeevikkunnu is a 1978 Indian Malayalam-language film,  directed by P. G. Vishwambharan. The film stars Madhu, Jayabharathi, Thikkurissy Sukumaran Nair and Sreelatha Namboothiri. The film has musical score by G. Devarajan.

Cast
Madhu
Jayabharathi
Thikkurissy Sukumaran Nair
Sreelatha Namboothiri
Sathar
Aranmula Ponnamma
N. Govindankutty
Santha Devi
Veeran

Soundtrack
The music was composed by G. Devarajan and the lyrics were written by Yusufali Kechery.

References

External links
 

1978 films
1970s Malayalam-language films
Films directed by P. G. Viswambharan